Danville is the primary village and a census-designated place (CDP) in the town of Danville, Caledonia County, Vermont, United States. As of the 2020 census, the CDP had a population of 385, out of 2,335 in the entire town of Danville.

The village is in west-central Caledonia County, south of the center of the town of Danville. U.S. Route 2 passes through the village, leading east  to St. Johnsbury and southwest  to Montpelier, the state capital. The village drains south to Brown Brook, a tributary of Joes Brook, and east to Water Andric. Joes Brook and Water Andric both flow southeast to the Passumpsic River, a south-flowing tributary of the Connecticut River.

References 

Populated places in Caledonia County, Vermont
Census-designated places in Caledonia County, Vermont
Census-designated places in Vermont